San Marino competed at the 1968 Summer Olympics in Mexico City, Mexico. They fielded four competitors, all men.

Cycling

Two cyclists represented San Marino in 1968.

Individual road race
 Gerard Lettoli — 5:10:22.35 hrs (→ 60th place)
 Enzo Frisoni — 5:12:46.82 hrs (→ 61st place)

Shooting

Two shooters represented San Marino in 1968.

Trap
 Leo Franciosi — 181 pts (→ 42nd place)
 Salvatore Pelliccioni — 177 pts (→ 45th place)

References

External links
Official Olympic Reports
Part Three: Results

Nations at the 1968 Summer Olympics
1968
Summer Olympics